Miss Kurdistan is a national beauty pageant for young women in Iraqi Kurdistan. It was founded in Erbil in 2012, the first Miss Kurdistan winner was Shene Aziz Ako. The winner is assigned a one-year contract, traveling across Kurdistan, and in some cases overseas. Aside from the job, the winner also receives a cash allowance for her entire reign.

Titleholders

Special Awards

Miss Kurdistan representatives at International beauty pageants 
Color key

Miss World

Miss Grand International

Miss United Continents

References

External links 
 

Iraqi awards
2012 establishments in Iraqi Kurdistan
Recurring events established in 2012
Beauty pageants in Iraq
Awards established in 2012
Kurdish culture
Women in Kurdistan